India receives foreign aid from various nations and international organisations.

Aid received 
In 2010, British newspaper The Guardian reported the aid received by India to be less than 1% of its GDP.

The United States Agency for International Development (USAID) compiled and published a data in 2015 indicating that from the period 1946-2012, India has been the recipient of highest aid from United States. The amount of economic aid, adjusted to inflation then, was reported to be USD 65.1 billion.

Refusal to take aid 
In recent times, the Government of India has on various occasions refused to take foreign aid for management of natural disasters like 2004 Indian Ocean tsunami, 2013 Uttarakhand floods, 2014 Kashmir floods, and 2018 Kerala floods. In year 2017, the Indian Government declared that India had been a net donor in 2015-16 and in the annual budget of year 2019-2020 ₹8,415 crore (USD 1.32 billion) were allocated (0.3% of the overall budget) for India's own foreign aid programme.

As donor 

India is not a member of Development Assistance Committee, which includes World's major donor countries. Despite that, India has recorded donations to various countries. India also provides non-monetary help in cases of natural disasters by means of sending supplies and manpower for rescue missions. In 2017, General V. K. Singh, the then Minister of State for External Affairs informed that India had been a net donor in 2015-16 by donating  as aid and receiving only  from foreign countries and global banks. India's major quantum of foreign aid is given to neighbouring countries. According to India's budget in 2021-22, its direct overseas aid stood at ₹18,154 crore (US$2.4 billion).

See also 
 Indo-Norwegian Project

References